Events from the year 1943 in the United States.

Incumbents

Federal Government 
 President: Franklin D. Roosevelt (D-New York)
 Vice President: Henry A. Wallace (D-Iowa)
 Chief Justice: Harlan F. Stone (New York)
 Speaker of the House of Representatives: Sam Rayburn (D-Texas)
 Senate Majority Leader: Alben W. Barkley (D-Kentucky)
 Congress: 77th (until January 3), 78th (starting January 3)

Events

January
 January 1 – Project Y, the Manhattan Project's secret laboratory at Los Alamos, New Mexico, for development and production of the first atomic bombs under the direction of J. Robert Oppenheimer, begins operations.
 January 4 – Culbert Olson, 29th Governor of California, is succeeded by Earl Warren.
 January 11 – The United States and United Kingdom give up territorial rights in China.
 January 14
 The Casablanca Conference, where Franklin D. Roosevelt becomes the first President of the United States to travel by airplane while in office (Miami, Florida to Morocco to meet with Winston Churchill to discuss World War II).
 Aircraft carrier USS Independence is commissioned.
 January 15 – The world's largest office building, The Pentagon, is dedicated in Arlington, Virginia.
 January 23 
Duke Ellington plays at New York City's Carnegie Hall for the first time.
Critic and commentator Alexander Woollcott suffers an eventually fatal heart attack during a regular broadcast of the CBS Radio roundtable program "People's Platform".

February

 February 3 – The legendary Four Chaplains of the U.S. Army are drowned when their ship is struck by a German torpedo.
 February 5 – Howard Hughes's Western The Outlaw, starring Jane Russell, is released for a week prior to Motion Picture Production Code censors requiring its withdrawal from distribution.
 February 6 – Walt Disney Productions' sixth feature film, Saludos Amigos, is released. It is the first of six package films they would release throughout the remainder of the 1940s.
 February 7 – WWII: It is announced that shoe rationing will go into effect in the US in two days.
 February 8 – WWII – Battle of Guadalcanal: United States forces defeat Japanese troops.
 February 11 – General Dwight D. Eisenhower is selected to command the Allied armies in Europe.
 February 14 – Battle of the Kasserine Pass: German General Erwin Rommel and his Afrika Korps launch an offensive against Allied defenses in Tunisia; it is the United States' first major battle defeat of the war.
 February 17 – Aircraft carrier USS Lexington is commissioned.
 February 20 – American movie studio executives agree to allow the Office of War Information to censor movies.
 February 25 – Aircraft carrier USS Princeton is commissioned.
 February 27 – The Smith Mine #3 in Bearcreek, Montana, explodes, killing 74 men.

March
 March 2 – WWII: Battle of the Bismarck Sea – United States and Australian forces sink Japanese convoy ships.
 March 4 – The 15th Academy Awards, hosted by Bob Hope, are presented at the Ambassador Hotel in Los Angeles, with William Wyler's Mrs. Miniver winning Outstanding Motion Picture. The film also receives 12 and 6 respective nominations and awards, with Wyler also winning Best Director.
 March 8 – WWII: American forces are attacked by Japanese troops on Hill 700 in Bougainville, in a battle that lasts five days.
 March 13 – WWII: On Bougainville, Japanese troops end their assault on American forces at Hill 700.
 March 26 – WWII – Battle of the Komandorski Islands: In the Aleutian Islands, the battle begins when United States Navy forces intercept Japanese troops attempting to reinforce a garrison at Kiska.
 March 31 – Rodgers and Hammerstein's Oklahoma! opens on Broadway, heralds a new era in "integrated" stage musicals, becomes an instantaneous stage classic, and goes on to be Broadway's longest-running musical up to that time (1948).

April

 April 13 – The Jefferson Memorial is dedicated on the 200th anniversary of Thomas Jefferson's birthday. The bronze statue is added in 1947.
 April 27 – The U.S. Federal Writers' Project is shuttered.

May

 May 11 – WWII: American troops invade Attu in the Aleutian Islands, in an attempt to expel occupying Japanese forces.
 May 12 – The Trident Conference begins in Washington, D.C., with Franklin D. Roosevelt and Winston Churchill taking part.
 May 17 
The United States Army contracts with the University of Pennsylvania's Moore School to develop the computer ENIAC.
The Memphis Belle becomes the first airplane in the 8th Air Force to complete a 25-mission tour of duty.
 May 19 – Winston Churchill addresses a joint session of the U.S. Congress.
 May 23 – Aircraft carrier USS Bunker Hill is commissioned.
 May 31 – The Zoot Suit Riots erupt between military personnel and Mexican American youths in East Los Angeles.

June
 June 3-10 The Zoot Suit Riots; The notorious riots lasted 10 days and carry the name of the targeted victims — young people dressed in wide trousers pegged at the ankle and long coats — but the violent rampage was led by sailors, soldiers and Marines.
 June 6 – The first game of the All-American Girls Professional Baseball League is played, a precursor of professional women's sports in the U.S.
 June 15–17 – Beaumont race riot of 1943 in Texas.
 June 20–22 – 1943 Detroit race riot.
 June 22 – The U.S. Army 45th Infantry Division lands in North Africa, prior to training at Arzew, French Algeria.

July
 July 6 – WWII: Americans and Japanese fight the Battle of Kula Gulf off Kolombangara.
 July 10 – WWII – Allied invasion of Sicily: The Allied invasion of Axis-controlled Europe begins with landings on the island of Sicily off mainland Italy, by the U.S. Army 45th Infantry Division and a number of Allied paratroopers.
 July 11 – United States Army forces assault the village of Piano Lupo, just outside Gela, Sicily.
 July 21 – Release of the musical film Stormy Weather starring Lena Horne, "Bojangles" Bill Robinson, Cab Calloway, the Nicholas Brothers and other African American performers.
 July 24 – 
 WWII: Operation Gomorrah begins: British and Canadian airplanes bomb Hamburg by night, those of the Americans by day. By the end of the operation in November, 9,000 tons of explosives will have killed more than 30,000 people and destroyed 280,000 buildings.
 Aircraft carrier USS Cabot is commissioned.

August

 August 1 – WWII: Operation Tidal Wave – 177 B-24 Liberator bombers from the U.S. Army Air Force bomb oil refineries at Ploieşti, Romania.
 August 1–2 – Harlem riot of 1943, a race riot.
 August 3 – WWII: John F. Kennedy's patrol torpedo boat PT-109 is rammed by a destroyer.
 August 5 – WWII: John F. Kennedy and crew are found by Solomon Islanders coastwatchers Biuku Gasa and Eroni Kumana with their dugout canoe.
 August 6 – WWII – Battle of Vella Gulf: Americans defeat a Japanese convoy off Kolombangara, as the U.S. Army drives the Japanese out of Munda airfield on New Georgia.
 August 14 – WWII: The Quadrant Conference begins in Quebec City; Canadian Prime Minister MacKenzie King meets with Winston Churchill and Franklin D. Roosevelt.
 August 16 – WWII: Aircraft carrier USS Intrepid is commissioned.
 August 17 – WWII: The US 7th Army under General George S. Patton arrives in Messina, Sicily, followed several hours later by the British 8th Army under Field Marshal Bernard L. Montgomery, thus completing the Allied conquest of Sicily.
 August 30 – The Lackawanna Limited train wreck at Wayland in upstate New York causes 29 deaths and injures 114 others.

September
 September 5 – WWII: The 503rd Parachute Regiment under American General Douglas MacArthur lands and occupies Nadzab, just east of the port city of Lae in northeastern Papua New Guinea.
 September 7 – A fire at the Gulf Hotel in Houston, Texas, kills 55 people.
 September 8 – United States General Dwight D. Eisenhower publicly announces the surrender of Italy to the Allies.

October
 October 1 – WWII: American forces enter liberated Naples.
 October 6 – WWII: Americans and Japanese fight the naval Battle of Vella Lavella.
 October 11 – The New York Yankees defeat the St. Louis Cardinals, 4 games to 1, to win their 10th World Series Title.
 October 12 – The American Broadcasting Company (ABC) begins broadcasting.
 October 28 – The alleged date of the Philadelphia Experiment, in which the U.S. destroyer escort USS Eldridge was to be rendered invisible to human observers for a brief period.
 October 30 – The Merrie Melodies animated short Falling Hare, one of the few shorts with Bugs getting out-smarted, is released in the United States.

November

 November 1 – WWII – Operation Goodtime: United States Marines land on Bougainville in the Solomon Islands.
 November 2 – WWII: In the early morning hours, American and Japanese ships fight the inconclusive Battle of Empress Augusta Bay off Bougainville.
 November 14 – Leonard Bernstein, substituting at the last minute for ailing principal conductor Bruno Walter, directs the New York Philharmonic in its regular Sunday afternoon broadcast concert over CBS Radio.  The event receives front-page coverage in The New York Times the following day.
 November 16 
WWII: After flying from Britain, 160 American bombers strike a hydro-electric power facility and heavy water factory in German-controlled Vemork, Norway.
WWII: A Japanese submarine sinks the surfaced U.S. submarine USS Corvina near Truk.
 November 17 – Aircraft carrier USS Bataan is commissioned
 November 20 – WWII: Battle of Tarawa: United States Marines land on Tawara and Makin atolls in the Gilbert Islands and take heavy fire from Japanese shore guns.
 November 22 – WWII: War in the Pacific: U.S. President Franklin D. Roosevelt, British Prime Minister Winston Churchill, and ROC leader Chiang Kai-shek meet in Cairo, Egypt, to discuss ways to defeat Japan.
 November 25 – WWII: Americans and Japanese fight the naval Battle of Cape St. George between Buka and New Ireland.
 November 28 – WWII – Tehran Conference: U.S. President Franklin D. Roosevelt, British Prime Minister Winston Churchill and Soviet leader Joseph Stalin meet in Tehran to discuss war strategy (on November 30 they establish an agreement concerning a planned June 1944 invasion of Europe codenamed Operation Overlord).
 November 29 – WWII: Aircraft carrier USS Hornet is commissioned.

December
 December 2 – Fifteen atomic scientists, including Soviet spy Klaus Fuchs, arrive from Britain to join the US atomic research project.
 December 3 – Edward R. Murrow delivers his classic "Orchestrated Hell" broadcast over CBS Radio, describing a Royal Air Force nighttime bombing raid on Berlin.
 December 4 – The Great Depression officially ends in the United States: With unemployment figures falling fast due to World War II-related employment, U.S. President Franklin D. Roosevelt closes the Works Progress Administration.
 December 15 – Aircraft carrier USS San Jacinto is commissioned.
 December 24 – WWII: U.S. General Dwight D. Eisenhower becomes the Supreme Allied Commander in Europe.

Ongoing
 World War II, U.S. involvement (1941–1945)

Births

January

 January 1 
 Jerilyn Britz, American golfer
 Jimmy Hart, American wrestling manager and singer 
 Stanley Kamel, American actor (died 2008)
 Don Novello, American comedian, screenwriter and producer
 Ronald Perelman, American businessman and philanthropist, founder of MacAndrews & Forbes
 January 3 – Adrian Garrett, American baseball player (died 2021)
 January 4 – Doris Kearns Goodwin, American writer
 January 8 
 Jimmy Elledge, American country musician (died 2012)
 Charles Murray, American political scientist and author
 January 9 – Scott Walker, singer and composer (d. 2019 in the United Kingdom)
 January 10 – Jim Croce, American surburbia musician (d. 1973)
 January 11 – Jim Hightower, American radio host, author
 January 13 – Richard Moll, American actor
 January 14 
 Charles W. Daniels, judge (d. 2019)
 Holland Taylor, actress
 January 16 – Peter T. Snowe, American politician, businessman (d. 1973)
 January 18 – Kay Granger, American politician
 January 19 – Janis Joplin, American rock singer (d. 1970)
 January 23
 Gary Burton, American vibraphone player and composer
 Gil Gerard, American actor and producer
 January 24
 Janice Raymond, American second-wave feminist activist
 Sharon Tate, American actress and model (d. 1969)
 January 25 – Tobe Hooper, American film director (d. 2017)
 January 28 – John Beck, American actor

February

 February 3
 Blythe Danner, American actress
 Dennis Edwards, American soul, R&B singer (d. 2018)
 February 5
 Nolan Bushnell, American video game pioneer
 Michael Mann, American film director, writer, and producer
 Craig Morton, American football player
 February 8 – Creed Bratton, actor
 February 9
 Joe Pesci, actor
 Joseph E. Stiglitz, economist, Nobel Prize laureate
 February 10
 Walter B. Jones Jr., American politician (d. 2019)
 Bill Laskey, American football player (died 2022)
 February 14 
 Eric Andersen, singer-songwriter
 Maceo Parker, musician (James Brown, P-Funk)
 February 19 – Homer Hickam, American author, retired NASA engineer
 February 20 – Moshe Cotel, American composer, pianist (d. 2008)
 February 21 – David Geffen, American record executive, film producer
 February 23 – Fred Biletnikoff, American football player, coach
 February 24
 Kent Haruf, novelist (d. 2014)
 Terry Semel, businessman
 February 26
 Bill Duke, American actor, director
 Bob Hite – American singer, musician (Canned Heat) (d. 1981)
 February 27 – Morten Lauridsen, American composer
 February 28 – Donnie Iris, American rock singer, guitarist (The Jaggerz, Wild Cherry, Donnie Iris and the Cruisers)

March

 March 1
 Gil Amelio, American entrepreneur
 Richard H. Price, American physicist
 March 2 – Peter Straub, American author (d. 2022)
 March 7 – Rick Redman, American football player (d. 2022)
 March 9
 Bobby Fischer, American chess player (d. 2008 in Iceland)
 Charles Gibson, American television journalist
 March 12 – Nosson Tzvi Finkel (Mir), Chicago-born Israeli rabbi (d. 2011 in Israel)
 March 14
 Anita Morris, American actress, singer and dancer (d. 1994)
 Leroy "Sugarfoot" Bonner, American guitarist (Ohio Players) (d. 2013)
 March 15 – Sly Stone, African-American singer (Sly and the Family Stone)
 March 16 – Helen Armstrong, American violinist (d. 2006)
 March 18
 Kevin Dobson, American actor
 Lowrell Simon, American singer (d. 2018)
 March 20 
 Gerard Malanga, American poet, photographer
 Douglas Tompkins, American conservationist, businessman (d. 2015) 
 March 22 – George Benson, African-American guitarist, singer and songwriter
 March 23
 Lee May, American baseball player (d. 2017)
 Sharon Presley, American author and academic
 March 25 – Paul Michael Glaser, American actor
 March 26 – Bob Woodward, American journalist
 March 30
 Jay Traynor, American singer (Jay and the Americans) (d. 2014)
 Dennis Etchison, American author and editor (d. 2019)
 March 31 – Christopher Walken, American actor

April

 April 4 – Judy Buenoano, American serial killer (d. 1998)
 April 5 – Max Gail, American actor (Barney Miller)
 April 6 − Susan Tolsky, American actress and voice actress
 April 8
 Miller Farr, American football player
 Jack O'Halloran, American boxer and actor
 April 11 – Harley Race, American professional wrestler, promoter and trainer (d. 2019)
 April 12 – Robert Durst, American real estate heir and convicted murderer (d. 2022)
 April 15 – Mighty Sam McClain, American singer, songwriter (d. 2015)
 April 21 – Jim Jamieson, American golfer (d. 2018)
 April 22 – Louise Glück, American poet, 12th US Poet Laureate and 2020 Nobel Prize laureate
 April 24 – Richard Sterban, American singer (The Oak Ridge Boys)
 April 25
 Alan Feduccia, American paleornithologist
 Lew Krausse Jr., American baseball player (d. 2021)
 April 26 – Gary Wright, American singer, songwriter, musician and composer
 April 28 – John Oliver Creighton, American astronaut
 April 30 – Bobby Vee, American pop singer (d. 2016)

May

 May 3 – Jim Risch, American politician
 May 5
 Raymond A. Jordan, American politician (d. 2022)
 Billie Moore, American basketball coach (d. 2022)
 May 6 –  James Kallstrom, American FBI officer (d. 2021)
 May 8 – Danny Whitten, American musician (d. 1972)
 May 10 – Richard Darman, American federal government official, businessman (d. 2008)
 May 11 
 Clarence Ellis, American computer scientist and academic (d. 2014)
 Matthew Lesko, American author
 May 12 – Linda Dano, American actress and author
 May 13 – Frederic Parke, American computer graphics researcher and academic
 May 16 
 Hank Adams, American native rights activist (d. 2020)
 Dan Coats, American politician
 May 17 – Mark W. Olson, American economist, politician (d. 2018) 
 May 23 – Jim Mueller, American sportscaster (d. 2022)
 May 24 – Gary Burghoff, American actor (M*A*S*H) 
 May 25 – Jessi Colter, American singer, composer
 May 27 – Bruce Weitz, American actor
 May 30 – James Chaney, African-American civil rights worker (d. 1964)
 May 31
 Sharon Gless, American actress
 Joe Namath, American football player

June

 June 1 – Richard Goode, American pianist
 June 6
 Ken Hatfield, American football player and coach
 Richard Smalley, American chemist, Nobel Prize laureate (d. 2005)
 June 7
 Nikki Giovanni, African-American poet, writer, commentator, activist and educator
 Mel Levine, American lawyer and politician
 Superstar Billy Graham, pro wrestler
 June 11 – Henry Hill, American gangster (d. 2012)
 June 14 – Jim Sensenbrenner, American politician
 June 16 – Joan Van Ark, American actress
 June 17
 Newt Gingrich, American politician, author and historian
 Barry Manilow, American pop musician 
 June 23
 Vint Cerf, American Internet pioneer
 James Levine, American conductor (d. 2021)
 June 25 – Carly Simon, American singer-songwriter
 June 26
 John Beasley, American actor
 Warren Farrell, American educator, activist and author on gender issues
 June 27 – Rico Petrocelli, American baseball player
 June 29 – Gene Littles, American basketball player and coach (d. 2021)
 June 30 – Florence Ballard, African-American singer, founder of The Supremes (d. 1976)

July

 July 1
 Freddie Lewis, American basketball player
 Jeff Wayne, American musician
 July 2 – Lauri Peters, American actress, dancer, singer, drama teacher, and author
 July 3 – Kurtwood Smith, American actor (That '70s Show)
 July 4
 Geraldo Rivera, American reporter, talk show host
 Bob Odell, former member of the New Hampshire Senate
 July 5 – Curt Blefary, American baseball player (d. 2001)
 July 7 – Joel Siegel, American film critic (d. 2007)
 July 9 – Suzanne Rogers, American actress
 July 10
 Arthur Ashe, African-American tennis player (d. 1993)
 Lynne Ober, former member of the New Hampshire House of Representatives
 July 11 – Tom Holland, American screenwriter, actor, and filmmaker
 July 12 
 Walter Murch, American film editor, sound designer
 Paul Silas, African-American basketball player and coach (d. 2022)
 July 14
 George Thomas Coker, United States Navy commander
 Harold Wheeler, American orchestrator, composer, conductor, arranger, record producer, and music director
 July 16 – Jimmy Johnson, American football coach, television analyst
 July 18 – Jerry Chambers, American basketball player
 July 20 – Christopher Murney, American actor, vocal artist
 July 21
 Edward Herrmann, American actor (d. 2014)
 Bob Shrum, American political consultant
 July 22 – Kay Bailey Hutchison, American politician
 July 23
 Randall Forsberg, American nuclear freeze advocate (d. 2007)
 Bob Hilton, American game show announcer, host
 Larry Manetti, American actor
 Clela Rorex, American county clerk, issued first same-sex marriage license (d. 2022)
 Tony Joe White, American singer, songwriter and guitarist (d. 2018)
 July 27 – Mary Love, African-American soul, gospel singer (d. 2013)
 July 28
 Mike Bloomfield, American guitarist and composer (d. 1981)
 Bill Bradley, American politician

August

 August 2 – Max Wright, American actor (d. 2019)
 August 5 – Nelson Briles, American baseball player (d. 2005)
 August 6 – Jim Hardin, American baseball pitcher (Baltimore Orioles, New York Yankees, Atlanta Braves) (d. 1991)
 August 9 – Ken Norton, African-American boxer, actor (d. 2013)
 August 10 – Ronnie Spector, born Veronica Bennett, American pop singer (The Ronettes) (d. 2022)
 August 11 – Abigail Folger, American heiress, murder victim (d. 1969)
 August 17 – Robert De Niro, American actor
 August 19 – Edwin Hawkins, American urban contemporary gospel musician (d. 2018)
 August 21 – Clydie King, American musician (d. 2019)
 August 23 – Bobby Diamond, American actor (d. 2019)
 August 27
 Bob Kerrey, American politician
 Tuesday Weld, American actress
 August 28 – Lou Piniella, American baseball player, manager
 August 30
 Tal Brody, American-born Israeli basketball player
 Robert Crumb, American artist, illustrator
 Altovise Davis, American entertainer (d. 2009)

September

 September 6 – Harris Hines, American judge (d. 2018)
 September 7 – Tommy Matchick, American baseball player (d. 2022)
 September 8 − Alvy Ray Smith, American computer scientist, co-founded Pixar
 September 9 – Art LaFleur, American actor (d. 2021)
 September 10
 Daniel Truhitte, American actor
 Neale Donald Walsch, American author (Conversations with God)
 September 11
 Jack Ely, singer and guitarist (d. 2015)
 Mickey Hart, drummer, percussionist, and musicologist
 September 13 – Mildred D. Taylor, American writer
 September 18 – Nina Wayne, American actress
 September 19 – Joe Morgan, American Hall of Fame baseball player (d. 2020)
 September 21 – Jerry Bruckheimer, American film and television producer
 September 22 – Toni Basil, American musician, video artist ("Mickey")
 September 25 – Robert Gates, 22nd United States Secretary of Defense
 September 28 – J. T. Walsh, American actor (d. 1998)

October

 October 1 – Jerry Martini, American musician
 October 2 – Franklin Rosemont, American poet (d. 2009)
 October 3 – Jeff Bingaman, American politician
 October 4 – Buddy Roemer, American politician, investor and banker (d. 2021)
 October 5
 Bonnie Bryant, American golfer
 Ben Cardin, American politician 
 October 6 – Michael Durrell, American actor
 October 7 – Oliver North, American military officer, military historian, political commentator, author and television host
 October 8 
 Chevy Chase, American comedian, actor (Saturday Night Live) 
 R. L. Stine, American novelist (Goosebumps)
 October 11 – Gene Watson, American country singer
 October 12 – Jeffrey R. MacDonald, American physician and United States Army Officer
 October 14 
 Lois Hamilton, American model, actress and artist (d. 1999)
 Lance Rentzel, American football player
 October 15 – Penny Marshall, American actress, director and producer (d. 2018)
 October 18 – Herschel Sparber, American actor 
 October 24 
 José E. Serrano, American politician
 Susan Shaw, American conservationist  (d. 2022)
 October 27
 Carmen Argenziano, American actor (d. 2019)
 Bev Scalze, American politician (d. 2021)
 October 29 – Don Simpson, American film producer, screenwriter, and actor (d. 1996)

November

 November 4 – Chuck Scarborough, American news anchor
 November 5 – Sam Shepard, American playwright, actor (d. 2017)
 November 7
 Stephen Greenblatt, American literary critic
 Michael Spence, American economist, Nobel Prize laureate
 November 10 – Saxby Chambliss, American politician
 November 12 – Wallace Shawn, American actor
 November 13 – Jay Sigel, American golfer
 November 14 – Peter Norton, American software engineer, businessman
 November 17 
 Lauren Hutton, American actress, model
 Michael Parks, American reporter (d. 2022)
 November 21 – Larry Mahan, American rodeo cowboy
 November 22
 Gary M. Heidnik, American killer, kidnapper, and rapist (d. 1999)
 Billie Jean King, American tennis player
 William Kotzwinkle, American novelist, screenwriter
 November 23 – Jeff Jordan, American football player (d. 2022) 
 November 24 – Dave Bing, American mayor, longtime NBA player
 November 25 – Peter Adair, American filmmaker (d. 1996)
 November 26 – Marilynne Robinson, American writer
 November 28 – Randy Newman, American musician
 November 30 – Terrence Malick, American film director

December

 December 1 – Kenny Moore, American athlete and journalist (d. 2022)
 December 2
 Wayne Allard, American politician 
 William Wegman, American photographer
 December 8
 Larry Martin, American paleontologist (d. 2013)
 Jim Morrison, American singer, songwriter and poet (d. 1971 in France)
 December 11 – John Kerry, American politician, 68th U.S. Secretary of State
 December 12
 Dickey Betts, American guitarist, singer, songwriter, and composer (The Allman Brothers Band)
 E. Jean Carroll, journalist and advice columnist
 Gianni Russo, American actor
 Grover Washington Jr., African-American saxophonist (d. 1999)
 December 13 – David W. Huff, American rock singer, guitarist of (David and the Giants)
 December 16 – Steven Bochco, American television producer (d. 2018)
 December 17 – Rick Nolan, American politician
 December 19 – Ross M. Lence, American political scientist (d. 2006)
 December 21 – Jack Nance, American actor (d. 1996)
 December 22 – Paul Wolfowitz, American political scientist 
 December 23
 Elizabeth Hartman, American actress (d. 1987)
 Harry Shearer, American actor, comedian and screenwriter
 December 24 
 James A. Johnson, American business leader, philanthropist (d. 2020)
 Thomas G. Plaskett, American business executive (d. 2021)
 December 27 – Cokie Roberts, American broadcast political journalist (d. 2019)
 December 28 – Craig MacIntosh, American illustrator
 December 31 – John Denver, American musician (d. 1997)

Deaths
 January 5 – George Washington Carver, African American botanist (b. 1864)
 January 6 – Alice May Douglas, author (b. 1865)
 January 7 – Nikola Tesla, electrical engineer (b. 1856 in Serbia)
 January 23 – Alexander Woollcott, critic (b. 1887)
 February 3 –  Verina Morton Jones, African-American physician, suffragist and clubwoman (b. 1865)
 February 11 – Bess Houdini, stage assistant and wife of Harry Houdini (b. 1876)
 April 3 – Conrad Veidt, actor (b. 1893 in Germany)
 April 4 – David Roitman, cantor (b. 1884 in Russia)
 May 20 – Joe Trees, athlete and oil executive (b. 1870)
 May 22 – Helen Herron Taft, First Lady of the United States (b. 1861)
 July 16 – Saul Raphael Landau, Polish Jewish lawyer, journalist, publicist and Zionist activist (b. 1870 in Kraków)
 September 15 – John Flammang Schrank, attempted assassin of Theodore Roosevelt (b. 1876)
 November 22 – Lorenz Hart, lyricist (b. 1895)
 December 14
 John W. Brady, Texas judge and murderer (b. 1869)
 John Harvey Kellogg, doctor (b. 1852)
 December 15 – Fats Waller, African American jazz pianist (b. 1904)

See also
 List of American films of 1943
 Timeline of United States history (1930–1949)
 Timeline of World War II

References

External links
 

 
1940s in the United States
United States
United States
Years of the 20th century in the United States